Ke Sovannaroth  (born 1962) is a Cambodian politician. She belongs to the Sam Rainsy Party and was elected to represent Siem Reap Province in the National Assembly of Cambodia in 2003.

References

Members of the National Assembly (Cambodia)
Living people
1962 births 
Candlelight Party politicians
Cambodia National Rescue Party politicians 
People from Phnom Penh
21st-century Cambodian women politicians
21st-century Cambodian politicians